The 2015 Pacific Challenge was the tenth World Rugby Pacific Challenge (known as the IRB Pacific Rugby Cup in previous seasons). The tournament, featuring six national 'A' rugby union teams, was hosted in Fiji. The tournament was won by Pampas XV, who defeated Fiji Warriors by 17–9 in the final.

Format
The teams were split into two pools and each team played the three opponents in the opposite pool. The teams finishing on top of each pool progressed to the final, the second teams in each pool played off for third place, and the bottom teams in each pool played off for fifth place.

Teams
The six competing teams were:

Pool A

 Pampas XV 
 

Pool B
 
 Fiji Warriors

Standings
Competition tables after the pool matches:

Pool A
{| class="wikitable"
|-
!width=170|Team
!width=40|Played
!width=40|Won
!width=40|Drawn
!width=40|Lost
!width=40|For
!width=40|Against
!width=40|Diff
!width=40|BP1
!width=40|BP2
!width=40|Pts
|- style="background:#cfc; text-align:center;"
|align=left| Pampas XV
| 3 || 3 || 0 || 0 || 89 || 42 || +47 || 2 || 0 || 14
|- style="text-align:center;"
|align=left| 
| 3 || 2 || 0 || 1 || 69 || 87 || -18  || 1 || 0 || 9
|- style="text-align:center;"
|align=left| 
| 3 || 0 || 0 || 3 || 41 || 212 || -171 || 1 || 0 || 1

|- bgcolor="#ffffff" align=center style="border:0px"
|colspan="15"|
|-
|- bgcolor="#ffffff" align=center style="border:0px"
|colspan="15" style=line-height:80% |Updated: 18 March 2015Source: worldrugby.org
|}
{| class="wikitable collapsible collapsed" style="text-align:center; line-height:100%; font-size:100%; width:60%;"
|-
! colspan="4" style="border:0px" |Competition rules
|-
| colspan="4" | Points breakdown:4 points for a win2 points for a draw1 bonus point for a loss by seven points or less1 bonus point for scoring four or more tries in a match
Classification:Teams standings are calculated as follows:Most log points accumulated from all matchesMost log points accumulated in matches between tied teamsHighest difference between points scored for and against accumulated from all matchesMost points scored accumulated from all matches
|}

Pool B
{| class="wikitable"
|-
!width=170|Team
!width=40|Played
!width=40|Won
!width=40|Drawn
!width=40|Lost
!width=40|For
!width=40|Against
!width=40|Diff
!width=40|BP1
!width=40|BP2
!width=40|Pts
|- style="background:#cfc; text-align:center;"
|align=left| Fiji Warriors
| 3 || 2 || 0 || 1 || 145 || 42 || +103 || 2 || 1 || 11
|- style="text-align:center;"
|align=left| 
| 3 || 1 || 0 || 2 || 101 || 72 || +29 || 1 || 1 || 6
|-  style="text-align:center;"
|align=left| 
| 3 || 1 || 0 || 2 || 95 || 85 || +10 || 1 || 1 || 6

|- bgcolor="#ffffff" align=center style="border:0px"
|colspan="15"|
|-
|- bgcolor="#ffffff" align=center style="border:0px"
|colspan="15" style=line-height:80% |<small>Updated: 18 March 2015
Source: worldrugby.org
|}

Pool matches

Round 1

Round 2

Round 3

Finals

5th place

3rd place

Final

References

External links
World Rugby Pacific Challenge 2015 official page
FORU website 

2015
2015 in Oceanian rugby union
2015 rugby union tournaments for national teams
2015 in Argentine rugby union
2015 in Fijian rugby union
2015 in Samoan rugby union
2015 in Tongan rugby union
2015 in Canadian rugby union
2014–15 in Japanese rugby union
International rugby union competitions hosted by Fiji